Coolio's Rules is a reality TV show on MuchMore about Coolio and his family produced by Oxygen Studios. Coolio's Rules focuses on Coolio and his family, living in Los Angeles, California. The master rapper tries to balance being a musician, a bachelor looking for love, an entrepreneurial caterer, and a single parent raising four teenagers. The series premiered October 28, 2008 and lasted 6 episodes.

Coolio's family
Coolio
Artis Ivey
Artisha Ivey
Brandi Ivey
Jackie Ivey
Jarez (Jarel Posey)- best friend

Episode list

Season 1
The first season of the show began in 2008.

 My House, My Rules - Coolio's 14-year-old daughter starts dating. Coolio's not happy. 
 Looking for Love - Coolio's signs up to OK Cupid and goes undercover. 
 Cooking with Coolio - Coolio introduces the new love of his life to beans on toast. 
 Def in Venice - Following a nasty bout of tinnitus Coolio visits Venice to try and relax. 
 Pass the Mic. Coolio joins his local am dram society for improv night. 
 Prodigal Son - Coolio's dad comes to visit but will he like the gangsta Martha Stewart's new decor?

References

External links
Official Show Website
IMDB
Pazsaz
Telebisyon

2000s American reality television series
2008 American television series debuts